William Montagu, 2nd Duke of Manchester, KB (April 1700 – 21 October 1739) was the son of Charles Montagu, 1st Duke of Manchester, and his wife, Dodington Greville, daughter of Robert Greville, 4th Baron Brooke of Beauchamps Court.

He married Lady Isabella Montagu, daughter of John Montagu, 2nd Duke of Montagu, on 16 April 1723.

He was made a Knight Companion of the Order of the Bath (KB) in 1725.

He died in 1739, aged 39, childless and his titles passed to his brother, Robert Montagu. Prior to his death the Duke was involved with the establishment of a new charity in London which would work to save children abandoned by their parents due to poverty and miserable conditions. The charity became known as the Foundling Hospital and its royal charter, naming the Duke of Manchester one of its founding governors, was awarded only four days prior to the duke's death.

References

1700 births
1739 deaths
William 2
Knights Companion of the Order of the Bath
Lord-Lieutenants of Huntingdonshire
William Montagu, 02nd Duke of Manchester